Jon Jacobs (born 10 September 1966 in Derbyshire, England) is an English actor, entrepreneur, director, producer, writer, and creator of the avatar Neverdie from the virtual world Entropia Universe that Reuters described as "a legendary adventurer, celebrity, and fabulously wealthy entrepreneur in the online world of Entropia". The Associated Press described Neverdie as an "Internet icon".

As a film actor, director and producer Jacobs is best known for films such as The Girl with the Hungry Eyes, Lucinda's Spell, Charlotte Sometimes, Hey DJ, and RevoLOUtion.

Biography
Jon Jacobs grew up in London. His mother, Jackie White, was Miss United Kingdom in 1962. His father, Adrian Jacobs, was an infamous 60s financier. Jacobs was expelled from the Famous British stage school Sylvia Young's in 1981. In 1986 he made his screen debut in the short film Salette. Jon followed up by directing and acting in Metropolis Apocalypse and Moonlight Resurrection 1987, Metropolis Apocalypse was an official selection in the Semaine de' la critique at the Cannes film Festival 1988. Jacobs's first lead role in a feature was the critically acclaimed Welcome Says the Angel, co-starring Rutger Hauer's daughter Ayesha, he also Played the lead in Hungarian Film Week Winner Johnny Famous and the audacious Festival hit Lucinda's Spell.

In 1992 Jacobs wrote and directed The Girl With the Hungry Eyes, which was executive produced by Cassian Elwes. In 1995 Jacobs wrote, directed, and starred in the micro-budget feature The Wooden Gun, a period black and white Western.

In 2002 Jacobs created the Iconic "Neverdie" avatar inside the Entropia Universe. In 2005 he co-directed and starred as DJ Hound Dog in the electronic dance movie Hey DJ!, featuring a line up of many of the worlds top international DJ's.

In 2005, Jacobs mortgaged his home to buy a virtual asteroid for US$100,000, being the most valuable virtual item ever sold at that time. Jacobs claims that he received an offer to sell the asteroid for US$200,000 the following day, but he refused. The asteroid space resort was named Club Neverdie after its owner's avatar name. In 2010 Jon Jacobs sold the Asteroid Space Resort to various other Entropia Universe participants for a total of US$635,000.

Jacobs's avatar subsequently appeared in The Discovery Channel documentaries Gamer Generation and I, Videogame, it also appeared in the Canal+ documentary La Vraie vie des mondes virtuels. ABC News did a video interview with Jacobs entitled A Portrait of the Avatar. The Los Angeles Times described Jacobs avatar as "the world's first cyber-superstar".

Neverdie was included in the 2008 Guinness Book of Records as well as the 2010 Guinness World Records Gamer's Edition for owning "the most expensive virtual item", namely the Asteroid Space Resort called Club Neverdie. The club is also host to the Massive Multiplayer Online World Championships (MMOWC). Neverdie has appeared on 60 Minutes.

The estate of his late father Adrian Jacobs attempted to sue J. K. Rowling and Bloomsbury Inc. for plagiarism of Adrian Jacobs's book Willy the Wizard in the Harry Potter series. However, the case was dismissed after security of costs were not paid to the court.

In 2008, Jacobs founded NEVERDIE Studios to create entertainment driven virtual worlds on the Entropia Platform. Planets produced by NEVERDIE Studios have included Rocktropia and Next Island.

In 2011, NEVERDIE Studios started working with Universal Pictures; the first title to launch was Hunt The Thing, a film length MMO inspired by both John Carpenter's 1982 version of The Thing and the 2011 prequel.

In 2015 NEVERDIE Studios announced the launch of a new virtual King Kong trilogy in collaboration with Universal Licensing and Partnerships, set in the ROCKtropia virtual world and based on the 2005 film King Kong, directed by Peter Jackson. The first title in the trilogy, Zombie King, features the tag line "King Kong is Back! ...From the Dead!"

On 27 March 2016 Jon Jacobs became the "First President of Virtual Reality". He proclaimed himself to be a democratic capitalist and pledged to create a billion jobs in virtual reality.

In April 2016 Jon Jacobs revealed his plan to create three million jobs in virtual reality by 2030 through the privatization of teleportation, the primary public transport system in the MMO Entropia Universe.

In 2019 Jacobs acted in the role of Walt Warshaw in the psychological thriller Lost Angelas. Jacobs won the Outstanding Performance Award at Method Fest Independent Film Festival in Beverly Hills alongside Ethan Hawke who tied for Best Actor and Best Supporting Actor winner Edward James Olmos.

See also
 Entropia Universe
 Anshe Chung

References

External links

1966 births
Living people
Businesspeople in software
English film producers
English male film actors
English film directors
English male television actors
Virtual avatars